Have a Little Talk With Myself is the fifth studio album by Ray Stevens and his third and final for Monument Records, released in 1969. Stevens left Monument in early 1970 and signed with Andy Williams' Barnaby Records label. This album is quite different from Stevens's previous albums, for he concentrates on interpreting the works of other writers, and only contributes two of his own compositions. The cover versions include Bob Dylan's "I'll Be Your Baby Tonight", the First Edition's hit "But You Know I Love You", two songs from the musical Hair, three songs of the Beatles, Blood, Sweat & Tears' hit "Spinning Wheel", and Joe South's hit "Games People Play".

The back of the album cover contains an essay by John Grissim of Rolling Stone, which describes how Stevens handles his recording sessions, then praises his craft in music, and finally describes Stevens' interpretations of the cover songs on the album. On the back of the album, there is also a technical note from the album's co-producer, Jim Malloy: "In addition to doing all the arrangements on this album, Ray Stevens...sings ALL the voices...plays the piano, organ, bells and any other special effect instruments...and plays the trumpet solo on 'SPINNING WHEEL.'" Two pictures are featured on the album's back cover as well - one with Stevens and Malloy laughing in the studio and another of Stevens playing the piano and singing into a microphone on the floor of the studio.

Stevens's version of "Sunday Mornin' Comin' Down" was the very first recording of the song. Although its composer Kris Kristofferson recorded it for his 1970 album Kristofferson, he never released his own version as a single. The song became a bigger hit for Johnny Cash one year after Stevens's release of the song.

Aside from "Sunday Mornin' Comin' Down" (which came out a few months before the album), two singles were taken from the album: the title track and "I'll Be Your Baby Tonight".

Track listing

Personnel
Musicians
 Ray Stevens – lead and backing vocals, piano, organ, bells, effects, arrangements, trumpet on “Spinning Wheel”
 Jerry Kennedy – guitar
 Norbert Putnam – bass
 Jerry Carrigan – drums
 Farrell Morris – percussion
Violin: Brenton Banks
Violin: Lillian Hunt
Violin: Sheldon Kurland
Violin: George Binkley
Violin: Martin Katahn
Violin: Solie Fott
Viola: Marvin Chantry
Viola: Gary Vanosdale
Viola: Howard Carpenter
Viola: Bobby Becker
Cello: Byron Bach
Trumpet: Don Sheffield
Trumpet: George Tidwell
Trumpet: Glenn Baxter
Trombone: Dennis Good
Trombone: Gene Mullins
Sax: Norm Ray
Sax: Johnny Duke
Producers: Ray Stevens, Jim Malloy
Engineers: Jim Malloy, Tommy Strong
Recorded in the Monument Recording Studio
Cover photo: Keats Tyler
Art direction: Ken Kim

Charts
Singles 

1969 albums
Ray Stevens albums
Albums produced by Ray Stevens
Monument Records albums